= Korean SMEs and Startups Agency =

South Korean non-profit

The Korean Small and Medium Enterprises and Startups Agency (KOSME) is a South Korean non-profit, government-funded organization established to implement government policies and programs for the growth and development of Korean small and medium enterprises (SMEs).

It provides direct loan support to Korean SMEs, totalling 4.7 trillion won (on the order of US$3 billion) in the second half of the 2024 as of September 2024.

KOSME works closely with the Korean Ministry of SMEs and Startups, specifically attempting to help Korean small businesses grow internationally.

As of 2024 the president of KOSME is Kang Seok-jin.

== GobizKOREA ==
GobizKOREA is an online trade portal site operated by KOSME that helps small and medium businesses in South Korea sell their products online.
